Duke of Épernon was a noble title in the peerage of France granted to Jean Louis de Nogaret de La Valette by Henry III of France in 1581.  It is named after Épernon.

List of Dukes of Épernon, 1581—1736

Louis de Pardaillan de Gondrin (1707–1743) sold Épernon to Adrien Maurice de Noailles, Duke of Noailles, and the title of "Duke of Épernon" fell into disuse.

References
Lords and Dukes of Épernon

1581 establishments in France